Lobley may refer to:

People
Bill Lobley, American comic actor
John Hodgson Lobley, English artist

Places
Lobley Hill